Augusto Marcacci (4 June 1892 – 7 December 1969) was an Italian actor and voice actor.

Selected filmography
 Dimmed Lights (1934)
 Lady of Paradise (1934)
 Golden Arrow (1935)
 Condottieri (1937)
 The Cuckoo Clock (1938)
 Beyond Love (1940)
 Eternal Melodies (1940)
 The First Woman Who Passes (1940)
 First Love (1941)
 The Mask of Cesare Borgia (1941)
 Girl of the Golden West (1942)
 Love Story (1942)
 Invisible Chains (1942)
 Fedora (1942)
 A Little Wife (1943)
 Rita of Cascia (1943)

References

Bibliography
 Mancini, Elaine. Struggles of the Italian film industry during fascism, 1930-1935. UMI Research Press, 1985.

External links

1892 births
1969 deaths
Actors from Florence
Italian male film actors
Italian male voice actors
Italian male stage actors
20th-century Italian male actors